The Victoria Tunnel is a subterranean wagonway that runs under Newcastle upon Tyne, England, from the Town Moor down to the River Tyne. It was built between 1839 and 1842 to transport coal from Leazes Main Colliery in Spital Tongues,  to riverside staithes (jetties), ready for loading onto boats for export.

The tunnel was driven through boulder clay, and formed by a base course of stone supporting a brick arch. Loaded wagons descended the incline of the tunnel under their own weight, and were rope-hauled back to the colliery by a stationary engine. The colliery closed in January 1860 and the tunnel was abandoned until the start of the Second World War, when it was converted for use as an air-raid shelter.

It remains largely intact.

History

Victorian wagonway 
When it opened in 1835, the Leazes Main or Spital Tongues colliery was one of many coal mines around Newcastle. The Industrial Revolution demand for coal was high.

Initially, the coal was carried on carts from the colliery through the streets of Newcastle upon Tyne to the river for shipping. This was slow, as the town was largely in a medieval layout, with narrow cobbled streets (Grainger Town was in the early stages of construction) and expensive due to road taxes. Porter and Latimer, the colliery owners, employed a local engineer, William E. Gilhespie, to construct an underground wagonway. An overground wagonway following much the same route was mooted, but the Freemen of Newcastle would not give permission for tracks to be laid across the Town Moor. Building a staithe here would require paying the keelmen to take the coal downstream of the bridge before it could be loaded into the colliers, thereby significantly reducing the profit margin on each load of coal shipped.

Construction 
Permission to build the tunnel was granted in 1838 and work started the following year. The tunnel was probably dug in sections. The engineers would have excavated a shaft down to the right level then tunneled out to link up with the next section. John Cherry was appointed to manage the tunneling. He was a former Yorkshire Lead Miner who had previously been employed as a miner at the Leazes Main Colliery. Building works were carried out by the firm of David Nixon, a builder of Prudhoe Street, Newcastle upon Tyne. Some 200 workers were employed in the construction of the tunnel and Thomas Fordyce in his Local Records for 8 January 1842 reported:
The workmen, to the number of two hundred, were regaled with a substantial supper and strong ale, supplied by Mrs. Dixon, the worthy hostess of the Unicorn Inn, Bigg-market, Newcastle. The Albion band attended, and enlivened the joyous occasion with their music.
The walls of the tunnel were lined in stone, and a double brick arch supported the roof. This was just large enough to accommodate the custom-built chaldron wagons.

Transporting the coal 
Because of the gradual gradient of the tunnel, loaded wagons were able to roll along a standard gauge rail track to the river. A rope was tied to the last wagon in the train and a stationary steam engine at the top of the tunnel hauled the empty wagons back up to the pithead.

Grand opening 
The Victoria Tunnel was named after the popular, young Queen Victoria. It was officially opened by the Mayor of Newcastle on 7 April 1842. A crowd of spectators including the sheriff and important merchants gathered on the quayside and at 1 pm cannons were fired as a train of eight wagons appeared out of the tunnel. Four of the wagons contained coal, and the others a "company of ladies and gentlemen and a band of musicians".

Pit closure 
The Victoria Tunnel was a financial success: it reduced the cost of transporting coal from the pit to the river by 88%. The colliery, however, was not a success and closed in 1860.

Having taken two and a half years to build, the tunnel was in use for just eighteen years.

Air raid shelter 
As Britain prepared for war in 1939, the public were instructed to practise "Air Raid Precautions" to protect themselves from bombs dropped by the German Luftwaffe. In Newcastle, the city engineer developed plans to convert the Victoria Tunnel into a communal air raid shelter that could hold 9,000 people.

Converting the tunnel 

Converting the tunnel into an air raid shelter cost £37,000. The tunnel was cleaned of coal dust and whitewashed in some places. Several concrete blast walls were added to stop potential bomb debris from entering the tunnel. Electric lighting was fitted and a new concrete floor was laid. Wooden benches and about 500 bunk beds were installed along the walls. Chemical toilets enclosed in canvas cubicles were built near the entrances.

Sixteen new entrances to the tunnel were originally planned, seven of which were added: Claremont Road, Hancock Museum, St Thomas' Churchyard, Ridley Place, Shieldfield Green, Crawhall Road, and Ouse Street. At Ouse Street, it was possible to walk directly into the tunnel, while the other access points looked similar to subway entrances and involved walking down a steep corridor.

Sheltering in the tunnel 
The tunnel was considered a dark, damp, and uncomfortable place to shelter. Many people were afraid to use it. Those who did remember sitting with their families and neighbours, sang songs while waiting nervously for the all-clear from above.

After the war 
At the end of the war, most of the fittings were removed from the tunnel and all of its entrances except Ouse Street were closed. This entrance had been built on private land in the garden of 14 Ouse Street.

Timeline

Route 
The Victoria Tunnel originally ran from the site of the Spital Tongues colliery near Hunters Road. It still exists under Claremont Road, and runs past the Hancock Museum, then close to the Civic Centre and St Mary's Place. From here it travels under Northumbria University City Campus, the Central Motorway and Shieldfield to St Dominic's Church on the corner of Crawhall Road and New Bridge Street. It then continues under St Ann's Estate to an entrance on Ouse Street. The section of tunnel that continued from here to the River Tyne was demolished in 1878.

Tunnel statistics

Restoration 
A  section of the tunnel in the Ouseburn Valley is still accessible via a World War II entrance on Ouse Street. A programme of visits was first established by the Ouseburn Partnership in 1998. After a period of closure in 2006, Newcastle City Council carried out a programme of structural repairs and public safety measures, funded by the Heritage Lottery Fund and Tyne & Wear Partnership. The Victoria Tunnel Education Project developed a number of resources about the tunnel and organised public tours and school workshops from 2009. From 2010 the Ouseburn Trust has run guided tours.

A sound and light installation, commissioned from artist Adinda van 't Klooster, focuses on the themes of war, fear, and nuclear weapons, using the codenames of British military research projects as a backdrop.

References

Further reading 
 The Victoria Tunnel; Tyne and Wear Industrial Monuments Trust
 Miller, Robert N Appleby (1927) Wood Rails Faced with iron Tread
 Edgar Allen News Lee, C.E. (1951)
 The Waggonways of Tyneside, Achaeologia Aeliana, Vol 7 no 1

External links 
 The Ouseburn Trust - manages the Victoria Tunnel

Transport in Newcastle upon Tyne
Tunnels in Tyne and Wear
Railway tunnels in England
Buildings and structures in Newcastle upon Tyne
Tourist attractions in Newcastle upon Tyne
Victorian era
Groups of World War II
Tunnels completed in 1842